Raua (Estonian for "Iron") is a subdistrict in the district of Kesklinn (Midtown), Tallinn, the capital of Estonia. It has a population of 5,654.

Gallery

References

Subdistricts of Tallinn
Kesklinn, Tallinn